The Sulawesi cuckoo (Cuculus crassirostris) is a species of cuckoo in the family Cuculidae. It is often known as the Sulawesi hawk-cuckoo but appears not to be related to the other hawk-cuckoos. It is endemic to Sulawesi Island in Indonesia. Its natural habitat is subtropical or tropical moist montane forests.

References

Cuculus
Birds described in 1872
Taxa named by Arthur Hay, 9th Marquess of Tweeddale
Endemic birds of Sulawesi
Taxonomy articles created by Polbot